Allan Lyburn (born January 6, 1972) is a Scottish-Canadian curler from Brandon, Manitoba. He does not curl competitively anymore.

Career
Prior to competing in Canada, Lyburn previously won the Scottish junior title with his brother William Lyburn in 1992. Lyburn skipped the Scottish rink at the 1992 World Junior Curling Championships, where they finished 6th. He and his family would move to Canada a short time later. His next major victory came when Lyburn won the 2012 Safeway Championship as a third on the Rob Fowler team to represent Manitoba at the Tim Hortons Brier. Lyburn was named the all-star third for the Brier following their bronze medal victory.

References

External links
 

Curlers from Manitoba
Scottish male curlers
Canadian male curlers
Living people
1972 births
Sportspeople from Brandon, Manitoba
Scottish emigrants to Canada
Canada Cup (curling) participants